This was the first edition of the tournament.

Dustin Brown and Andrea Vavassori won the title after defeating Rafael Matos and Felipe Meligeni Alves 7–6(7–5), 6–1 in the final.

Seeds

Draw

References

External links
 Main draw

NÖ Open - Doubles